Head of a Halberdier is a fragment of a painting by a follower of Netherlandish artist Hieronymus Bosch. It is currently in the Museo del Prado in Madrid. It is thought to be a cropped piece of a larger painting which might have been damaged.

A halberdier is a guard who wields a halberd.

References

1490s paintings
Paintings by Hieronymus Bosch in the Museo del Prado